Standings and Results for Group A of the Regular Season phase of the 2012–13 Eurocup basketball tournament.

Standings
All times are CET (UTC+1).

Game 1

Game 2

Game 3

Game 4

Game 5

Game 6

References

External links
Standings

2012–13 Eurocup Basketball